Absolute molar mass is a process used to determine the characteristics of molecules.

History 

The first absolute measurements of molecular weights (i.e. made without reference to standards) were based on fundamental physical characteristics and their relation to the molar mass. The most useful of these were membrane osmometry and sedimentation.

Another absolute instrumental approach was also possible with the development of light scattering theory by Albert Einstein, Chandrasekhara Venkata Raman, Peter Debye, Bruno H. Zimm, and others. The problem with measurements made using membrane osmometry and sedimentation was that they only characterized the bulk properties of the polymer sample. Moreover, the measurements were excessively time consuming and prone to operator error. In order to gain information about a polydisperse mixture of molar masses, a method for separating the different sizes was developed.  This was achieved by the advent of size exclusion chromatography (SEC).  SEC is based on the fact that the pores in the packing material of chromatography columns could be made small enough for molecules to become temporarily lodged in their interstitial spaces. As the sample makes its way through a column the smaller molecules spend more time traveling in these void spaces than the larger ones, which have fewer places to "wander". The result is that a sample is separated according to its hydrodynamic volume .  As a consequence, the big molecules come out first, and then the small ones follow in the eluent.  By choosing a suitable column packing material it is possible to define the resolution of the system.  Columns can also be combined in series to increase resolution or the range of sizes studied.

The next step is to convert the time at which the samples eluted into a measurement of molar mass.  This is possible because if the molar mass of a standard were known, the time at which this standard eluted should be equal to a specific molar mass. Using multiple standards, a calibration curve of time versus molar mass can be developed. This is significant for polymer analysis because a single polymer could be shown to have many different components, and the complexity and distribution of which would also affect the physical properties.  However this technique has shortcomings.  For example, unknown samples are always measured in relation to known standards, and these standards may or may not have similarities to the sample of interest. The measurements made by SEC are then mathematically converted into data similar to that found by the existing techniques.

The problem was that the system was calibrated according to the Vh characteristics of polymer standards that are not directly related to the molar mass. If the relationship between the molar mass and Vh of the standard is not the same as that of the unknown sample, then the calibration is invalid. Thus, to be accurate, the calibration must use the same polymer, of the same conformation, in the same eluent and have the same interaction with the solvent as the hydration layer changes Vh.

Benoit et al. showed that taking into account the hydrodynamic volume would solve the problem.  In his publication, Benoit showed that all synthetic polymers elutes on the same curve when the log of the intrinsic viscosity multiplied by the molar mass was plotted against the elution volume.  This is the basis of universal calibration which requires a viscometer to measure the intrinsic viscosity of the polymers.  Universal calibration was shown to work for branched polymers, copolymers as well as starburst polymers.

For good chromatography, there must be no interaction with the column other than that produced by size.  As the demands on polymer properties increased, the necessity of getting absolute information on the molar mass and size also increased. This was especially important in pharmaceutical applications where slight changes in molar mass (e.g. aggregation) or shape may result in different biological activity. These changes can actually have a harmful effect instead of a beneficial one.

To obtain molar mass, light scattering instruments need to measure the intensity of light scattered at zero angle.  This is impractical as the laser source would outshine the light scattering intensity at zero angle.  The 2 alternatives are to measure very close to zero angle or to measure at many angle and extrapolate using a model (Rayleigh, Rayleigh–Gans–Debye, Berry, Mie, etc.) to zero degree angle.

Traditional light scattering instruments worked by taking readings from multiple angles, each being measured in series. A low angle light scattering system was developed in the early 1970s that allowed a single measurement to be used to calculate the molar mass. Although measurements at low angles are better for fundamental physical reasons (molecules tend to scatter more light in lower angle directions than in higher angles), low angle scattering events caused by dust and contamination of the mobile phase easily overwhelm the scattering from the molecules of interest. When the low-angle laser light scattering (LALLS) became popular in the 1970s and mid-1980s, good quality disposable filters were not readily available and hence multi-angle measurements gained favour.

Multi-angle light scattering was invented in the mid-1980s and instruments like that were able to make measurements at the different angles simultaneously but it was not until the later 1980s  that the connection of multi-angle laser light scattering (MALS) detectors to SEC systems was a practical proposition enabling both molar mass and size to be determined from each slice of the polymer fraction.

Applications 
Light scattering measurements can be applied to synthetic polymers, proteins, pharmaceuticals and particles such as liposomes, micelles, and encapsulated proteins. Measurements can be made in one of two modes which are un-fractionated (batch mode) or in continuous flow mode (with SEC, HPLC or any other flow fractionation method). Batch mode experiments can be performed either by injecting a sample into a flow cell with a syringe or with the use of discrete vials. These measurements are most often used to measure timed events like antibody-antigen reactions or protein assembly. Batch mode measurements can also be used to determine the second virial coefficient (A2), a value that gives a measure of the likelihood of crystallization or aggregation in a given solvent. Continuous flow experiments can be used to study material eluting from virtually any source.  More conventionally, the detectors are coupled to a variety of different chromatographic separation systems. The ability to determine the mass and size of the materials eluting then combines the advantage of the separation system with an absolute measurement of the mass and size of the species eluting.

The addition of an SLS detector coupled downstream to a chromatographic system allows the utility of SEC or similar separation combined with the advantage of an absolute detection method. The light scattering data is purely dependent on the light scattering signal times the concentration; the elution time is irrelevant and the separation can be changed for different samples without recalibration. In addition, a non-size separation method such as HPLC or IC can also be used.
As the light scattering detector is mass dependent, it becomes more sensitive as the molar mass increases. Thus it is an excellent tool for detecting aggregation. The higher the aggregation number, the more sensitive the detector becomes.

Low-angle (laser)-light scattering (LALS) method 

LALS measurements are measuring at a very low angle where the scattering vector is almost zero. LALS does not need any model to fit the angular dependence and hence is giving more reliable molecular weights measurements for large molecules.  LALS alone does not give any indication of the root mean square radius.

Multi-angle (laser)-light scattering (MALS) method 

MALS measurements work by calculating the amount of light scattered at each angle detected. The calculation is based on the intensity of light measured and the quantum efficiency of each detector.  Then a model is used to approximate the intensity of light scattered at zero angle. The zero angle light scattered is then related to the molar mass.

As previously noted, the MALS detector can also provide information about the size of the molecule. This information is the Root Mean Square radius of the molecule (RMS or Rg). This is different from the Rh mentioned above who is taking the hydration layer into account.  The purely mathematical root mean square radius is defined as the radii making up the molecule multiplied by the mass at that radius.

Bibliography 
A. Einstein, Ann. Phys. 33 (1910), 1275
C.V. Raman, Indian J. Phys. 2 (1927), 1
P.Debye, J. Appl. Phys. 15 (1944), 338
B.H. Zimm, J. Chem. Phys. 13 (1945), 141
B.H. Zimm, J. Chem. Phys. 16 (1948), 1093
B.H. Zimm, R.S. Stein and P. Dotty, Pol. Bull. 1,(1945), 90
M. Fixman, J. Chem. Phys. 23 (1955), 2074
A.C. Ouano and W. Kaye J. Poly. Sci. A1(12) (1974), 1151
Z. Grubisic, P. Rempp, and H. Benoit, J. Polym. Sci., 5 (1967), 753
Flow Through MALS detector, DLS 800, Science Spectrum Inc.
P.J. Wyatt, C. Jackson and G.K. Wyatt Am. Lab 20(6) (1988), 86
P.J. Wyatt, D. L. Hicks, C. Jackson and G.K. Wyatt Am. Lab. 20(6) (1988), 106
C. Jackson, L.M. Nilsson and P.J. Wyatt J. Appl. Poly. Sci. 43 (1989), 99

Chemical properties
Mass